The 2019 Judo Grand Slam Ekaterinburg was held in Yekaterinburg, Russia from 15 to 17 March 2019.

Medal summary

Men's events

Women's events

Source Results

Medal table

References

External links
 

2019 IJF World Tour
2019 Judo Grand Slam
Judo